Portmore may refer to:
 Portmore, Jamaica
 Portmore United F.C.
 Portmore, a townland in County Antrim, Northern Ireland
 Portmore Lough in Northern Ireland
 Bonny Portmore, a lament of a large oak which once stood near Portmore Lough
 Portmore, Hampshire
 Earl of Portmore